Longiano is a comune (municipality) in the Province of Forlì-Cesena in the Italian region Emilia-Romagna, located about  southeast of Bologna and about  southeast of Forlì. 
Longiano borders the following municipalities: Borghi, Cesena, Gambettola, Gatteo, Montiano, Roncofreddo, Santarcangelo di Romagna, Savignano sul Rubicone.

Main sights
Castello Malatestiano (Castle, 13th century): now houses the Fondazione Tito Balestra, a museum of contemporary and modern art from the region of  Emilia Romagna.
Teatro Petrella (19th century)

Demographic evolution

References

External links
 www.comune.longiano.fc.it

Cities and towns in Emilia-Romagna
Castles in Italy